Calamaria is a large genus of dwarf burrowing snakes of the family Colubridae. The genus contains 66 recognized species. The genus is endemic to Asia.

Description
Species in the genus Calamaria share the following characteristics. The eight to 11 maxillary teeth are subequal; the anterior mandibular teeth are somewhat longer than the posterior ones. The head is not distinct from neck; the eye is small, with a round pupil; the nostril is pierced in a minute nasal scale. No loreal, internasal, or temporal scales are present; the preocular can be present or absent; the parietals contact the labials. The body is cylindrical, with smooth dorsal scales, without apical pits, in 13 rows. The tail is short; the subcaudals are paired.

Species
The following 67 described species in the genus Calamaria are recognized as being valid.
Calamaria abramovi 
Calamaria abstrusa 
Calamaria acutirostris 
Calamaria albiventer 
Calamaria alcalai 
Calamaria alidae 
Calamaria andersoni 
Calamaria apraeocularis 
Calamaria arcana 
Calamaria banggaiensis 
Calamaria battersbyi 
Calamaria bicolor 
Calamaria bitorques 
Calamaria boesemani 
Calamaria borneensis 
Calamaria brongersmai  – Brongersma's reed snake
Calamaria buchi 
Calamaria butonensis 
Calamaria ceramensis 
Calamaria concolor 
Calamaria crassa 
Calamaria curta 
Calamaria doederleini 
Calamaria dominici 
Calamaria eiselti 
Calamaria everetti 
Calamaria forcarti 
Calamaria gervaisii 
Calamaria gialaiensis 
Calamaria grabowskyi 
Calamaria gracillima 
Calamaria griswoldi 
Calamaria hilleniusi 
Calamaria ingeri 
Calamaria javanica 
Calamaria joloensis 
Calamaria lateralis 
Calamaria lautensis 
Calamaria leucogaster 
Calamaria linnaei 
Calamaria longirostris 
Calamaria lovii 
Calamaria lumbricoidea 
Calamaria lumholtzi 
Calamaria margaritophora 
Calamaria mecheli 
Calamaria melanota 
Calamaria modesta 
Calamaria muelleri 
Calamaria nebulosa 
Calamaria nuchalis 
Calamaria palavanensis 
Calamaria pavimentata 
Calamaria pfefferi  – Pfeffer's reed snake
Calamaria prakkei 
Calamaria rebentischi 
Calamaria sangi 
Calamaria schlegeli  – pink-headed reed snake
Calamaria schmidti  – Schmidt's reed snake
Calamaria septentrionalis 
Calamaria strigiventris  – striped-belly reed snake
Calamaria suluensis 
Calamaria sumatrana 
Calamaria thanhi 
Calamaria ulmeri 
Calamaria virgulata 
Calamaria yunnanensis 

Nota bene: A binomial authority in parentheses indicates that the species was originally described in a genus other than Calamaria.

See also
Colubridae

References

External links 

 
Colubrids
Snake genera
Taxa named by Friedrich Boie